A judgement is a balanced weighing up of evidence to form a decision or opinion.

Judgment or judgement may also refer to:
 Judgment (mathematical logic)
 Judgment (law), a formal decision made by a court following a lawsuit
 Value judgment, a determination of something's worth or goodness, based upon a particular set of values or point of view

Cards and games 
 Judgement (Tarot card), a Major Arcana card in the Tarot
 Judgement (card game), another name for Oh Hell, especially in India
 Judgment, a character in the Guilty Gear fighting game series
 Judgement, a character in the Battle Arena Toshinden fighting game series
 Judgment (Magic: The Gathering), an expansion to the Magic: The Gathering collectible card game
 Judgment: Apocalypse Survival Simulation, a 2018 video game set during the Apocalypse
 Judgment (video game), a video game set in the Yakuza universe

Law 
 Confession of judgment, a clause in a contract in which one party waives defenses against the other party
 Consent judgment, a final, binding judgment in a case in which both parties agree, by stipulation, to a particular outcome
 Declaratory judgment, a judgment of a court in a civil case which declares the rights, duties, or obligations of each party in a dispute
 Default judgment, a binding judgment in favor of the plaintiff when the defendant has not responded to a summons
 Summary judgment, a legal term which means that a court has made a determination without a full trial
 Vacated judgment, the result of the judgment of an appellate court which overturns, reverses, or sets aside the judgment of a lower court

Literature
 "The Judgment", a 1912 short story by Franz Kafka

Religion
 Judgement (afterlife), in religion a judgment after death, weighing the deeds in life
 Divine judgment, the judgment of God
 General judgment, the Christian theological concept of a judgment of the souls of the dead by nation and as a whole
 Investigative judgment, a unique Seventh-day Adventist doctrine
 Last Judgment, the ethical-judicial trial, judgment, and punishment/reward of all individual humans by a divine tribunal at the end of time
 Particular judgment, a doctrine in Christian eschatology
 Pre-advent judgment, a belief that the final judgment will occur before the Second Coming of Jesus

Film
 Ai-Fak or The Judgment, a 2004 Thai film
 Judgment (1990 film), a film directed by Tom Topor
 Judgement (1992 film), a feature film, directed by William Sachs
 Judgement (1999 film), a short film by South Korean film director Park Chan-wook
 Apocalypse IV: Judgment, a 2001 film released by Cloud Ten Pictures, and is the third sequel to the 1998 film Apocalypse
 The Judgment (2014 film), a Bulgarian film
 Judgement (2019 film), a Marathi-language Indian film; see Tejashri Pradhan
 The Judgement (2020 film), a Dutch film

Television
 "The Judgment", the 1967 two-part final episode of the television show The Fugitive
 "Judgment" (Angel), episode 1 of season 2 of the television show Angel
 "Judgment" (Star Trek: Enterprise), a 2003 second-season episode of the television show Star Trek:Enterprise
 "Judgment" (Person of Interest), an episode of the American television drama series Person of Interest
"Judgement", a 2001 episode of the BBC comedy series The Office

Music 
 Judgement Records, a record label
 Judgement (Anathema album), 1999
 Judgement (VNV Nation album), 2007
 "The Judgment", a song by Solomon Burke from the 2002 album Don't Give Up on Me
 "Judgement", a song by Iron & Wine from the 2015 album Archive Series Volume No. 1

See also 
 Judgement Rocks
 Judgment Day (disambiguation)
 Judgment Night (disambiguation)